The Transport Act 1947 (10 & 11 Geo. 6 c. 49) was an Act of the Parliament of the United Kingdom. Under the terms of the Act, the railway network, long-distance road haulage and various other types of transport were nationalised and came under the administration of the British Transport Commission. The BTC was responsible to the Ministry of Transport for general transport policy, which it exercised principally through financial control of a number of executives set up to manage specified sections of the industry under schemes of delegation.

Overview
The Act was part of the nationalisation agenda of Clement Attlee's Labour government, and took effect from 1 January 1948. In Northern Ireland, the Ulster Transport Authority acted in a similar manner. The government also nationalised other means of transport such as: canals, sea and shipping ports, bus companies, and eventually, in the face of much opposition, road haulage. All of these transport modes, including British Railways, were brought under the control of a new body, the British Transport Commission (BTC).

The BTC was a part of a highly ambitious scheme to create a publicly owned, centrally planned, integrated transport system. In theory, the BTC was to co-ordinate different modes of transport, to co-operate and supplement each other instead of competing. This was to be achieved by means of fare and rate adjustments. In practice, very little integration between modes ever materialised.

Section 5 of the Act provided for the setting up of a number of executives within the BTC: the Railway Executive; the Docks and Inland Waterways Executive; the Road Transport Executive; and the London Transport Executive were to be created immediately, with the Hotels Executive to be set up at a later date. The same section allowed the number and names of these executives to be varied as necessary.

Road transport
The road haulage industry bitterly opposed nationalisation, and found allies in the Conservative Party. Once the Conservatives were elected in 1951, road haulage was soon privatised and deregulated, but the railways and buses remained regulated, and were left under the control of the British Transport Commission.

Railways

After the Second World War, the Big Four railway companies of the grouping era were effectively bankrupt, and the Act was intended to bring about some stability in transport policy. As part of that policy, British Railways was established to run the railways. (The Transport Act 1948 later transferred the lines in Northern Ireland formerly of the LMS, the Northern Counties Committee, to the Ulster Transport Authority.)

Shares in the railway companies were exchanged for British Transport Stock, with a guaranteed 3% return chargeable to the BTC, and were repayable after forty years.

The level of compensation paid has proved to be a matter of historical controversy. Some commentators, including The Economist and the London Stock Exchange stated that because the government based the levels of compensation for former railway shareholders on the valuation of their shares in 1946 (when the whole railway infrastructure was in a run-down and dilapidated state because of war damage and minimal maintenance) the railways were acquired comparatively cheaply.

However, others point out that three of the Big Four were effectively bankrupt before the onset of war in 1939 and were only saved from the ignominy of actually declaring bankruptcy by the guaranteed income provided by the wartime government and the temporary surge in rail traffic caused by the restrictions on other forms of transport during and immediately after the war. The exchange of potentially worthless private stock for government gilts based on a valuation during an artificially created boom could thus be considered a very good deal.

Despite nationalisation and the creation of British Railways (BR), the rail system changed little, and was left in much the same way as it had been before nationalisation. BR was divided into six administrative regions: Eastern, London Midland, North Eastern, Scottish, Southern and Western.

These closely mirrored the regions covered by the former companies in England and Wales, although with the addition of a separate Scottish Region. The North Eastern Region was eventually amalgamated with the Eastern Region, reflecting the English operations of the 1923–1947 London and North Eastern Railway.

Transport Act 1962

Fifteen years later, under the Transport Act 1962, Harold Macmillan's Conservative government dissolved the British Transport Commission and created the British Railways Board to take over railway duties from 1 January 1963 and the Transport Holding Company to take over bus operations from the same date.

References

External links
Summary of the Act
Text of the Act

Railway Acts
Former nationalised industries of the United Kingdom
United Kingdom Acts of Parliament 1947
1947 in transport
Transport policy in the United Kingdom
Nationalisation in the United Kingdom
History of transport in the United Kingdom
August 1947 events in the United Kingdom